Emily Beaton (born 9 April 1987) was an Australian netball player in the ANZ Championship, playing for the Adelaide Thunderbirds. She was also starting WA for the Australian Diamonds squad that played in the 2011 World Netball Series tournament in Liverpool. She was part of both Adelaide Thunderbirds premiership teams, both in 2010 and 2013. She retired at the end of the 2016 ANZ Championship season as the only player remaining from the Thunderbirds original ANZ Championship team in 2008. This made her the only Thunderbirds player to play for the Adelaide Thunderbirds throughout the entire ANZ Championship period, having played 100 games. She now runs her typography business, Cleverhand.

References

1987 births
Living people
Australian netball players
Adelaide Thunderbirds players
ANZ Championship players
Netball players from South Australia
AIS Canberra Darters players
Australia international Fast5 players
Contax Netball Club players
South Australia state netball league players